Chris Bentley may refer to:

Chris Bentley (rugby union) (born 1987), English rugby union player
Chris Bentley (politician) (born  1956), Canadian politician